The 10th Asian Table Tennis Championships 1990 were held in Kuala Lumpur, Malaysia from 9 to 17 December 1990. It was organised by the Table Tennis Association of Malaysia under the authority of Asian Table Tennis Union (ATTU) and International Table Tennis Federation (ITTF).

Medal summary

Medal table

Events

See also
World Table Tennis Championships
Asian Cup

References

Asian Table Tennis Championships
Asian Table Tennis Championships
Table Tennis Championships
Table tennis competitions in Malaysia
Asian Table Tennis Championships
Asian Table Tennis Championships